Something Always Goes Wrong is the second album by Dntel (Jimmy Tamborello), released in 2001 on the Phthalo Records label.

Track listing
 "In Which Our Hero Begins His Long and Arduous Quest"
 "In Which Our Hero Finds a Faithful Sidekick"
 "In Which Our Hero Is Put Under a Spell"
 "In Which Our Hero Dodges Bullets and Swords"
 "In Which Our Hero Frees the Damsel in Distress"
 "In Which Our Hero Is Decapitated by the Evil King"
 "In Which Our Hero Begins His Long and Arduous Quest (Seq remix)"
 "In Which Our Hero Was Taken by Surprise (Languis remix)"
 "The S.O.S."
 "A Machine and a Memory Keep You Alive"

External links
 Album at discogs

2001 albums
Dntel albums